A corn maze or maize maze is a maze cut out of a corn field. Originally, the first full-size corn maze was believed to be created in Annville, Pennsylvania in 1993; however, similar corn mazes were highlighted in newspapers as early as 1982.  Corn mazes have become popular tourist attractions in North America, and are a way for farms to generate tourist income. Many are based on artistic designs such as characters from movies. Corn mazes appear in many different designs. Some mazes are even created to tell stories or to portray a particular theme. Most have a path which goes all around the whole pattern, either to end in the middle or to come back out again, with various false trails diverging from the main path. In the United Kingdom, they are known as maize mazes, and are especially popular with farms in the east of England. These mazes are normally combined with other farm attractions of interest to families and day trippers. Some of these attractions include hay rides, a petting zoo, play areas for children, and picnic areas. Each year a few of the mazes are featured in national newspapers and TV. In the U.S., corn mazes typically are cut down circa the first week of November; in the UK typically in September after children return to school.

Creation 

In order for farmers to create a corn maze they must carefully plan their production, design, and marketing techniques in advance.

 Planting the correct variety of corn is important for the success of a corn maze. Farmers must consider stalk strength and height when selecting the right hybrid to plant.
 Farmers must watch for stalk rot since it is one of the most frequently observed diseases. Key factors for stalk rot include improper fertilization, moisture stress, and disease development. 
 Moderate plant population (about 20,000 plants per acre) would be considered ideal. If moderate plant population is not followed crop crowding can occur.
 Since farmers planting for corn mazes are not growing the crop for maximum yield they should not apply too much nitrogen fertilizer. Rutgers Cooperative Research and Extension recommends the total nitrogen rate for the season should not exceed about 125 pounds per acre (140 kg per hectare).
 Corn maze crops should be planted from mid to late May in the northern hemisphere, or mid to late November in the southern hemisphere. This is two to three weeks later than crops being planted for grain.
 When cutting the walkways farmers must cut the internal growing point of the stalk off to avoid regrowth. Some farmers use herbicides, roto-tillers, or mowers to cut the walkways.

See also
 Hedge maze
 Straw maze
 Crop circle
 Halloween Cornfield Maze
 Picture maze

References

External links

 Maize Maze Association Trade Association for UK Maize Maze owners and operators, lists UK Maize Mazes.
 The Cornies Twelve Czech maize mazes ("Kukuřičáci"). 

Farms
Maize
Mazes